Ulrich Inderbinen (December 3, 1900, Zermatt, Valais – June 14, 2004) was a Swiss mountain guide famous for his longevity and love for mountain climbing. He had been on the top of Matterhorn over 370 times and made his last ascent of it when he was 90. Though he was not the first to summit the Matterhorn, he may have done it the best. His fame laid not in conquering mountains but safely guiding visitors to the top.

He took up ski-racing for the first time at the age of 82 when he discovered that he was the only competitor in his age group for the local annual ski guides' race.

References

1900 births
2004 deaths
People from Zermatt
Alpine guides
Swiss centenarians
Men centenarians
Swiss mountain climbers
Sportspeople from Valais